Laura Winter (born ) is a sports presenter, event host and commentator, specialising in Formula 1, Rugby and cycling, amongst a variety of other sports. As well as presenting British Cycling’s road and cyclocross coverage on Eurosport, BBC and ITV4, she is Voxwomen's dedicated presenter for the monthly Voxwomen Cycling Show which is broadcast on multiple channels worldwide. She is also the NBC reporter and commentator for the Tour of California women's race.

A former rower, Winter has been the Henley Royal Regatta's reporter for BT Sport since 2017.

In 2019, Winter presented four rounds of the World Rallycross Championship, before making her debut in Formula One at the 2019 Belgian GP.

On International Women's Day in 2019, Winter was violently attacked by her then boyfriend, ending up in hospital. She hopes speaking about her own struggle with trauma can help others talk about the repercussions of violence and abuse, and encourage them to come forward and seek help safely.

References

British television presenters
Women sports commentators
Living people
1989 births